Tiruchirappalli division is a revenue division in the Tiruchirapalli district of Tamil Nadu, India. It comprises the taluks of Tiruchirappalli West taluk, Tiruchirappalli East taluk, Thiruverumbur taluk.

References 

 

Tiruchirappalli district